Dezful is a medium range ballistic missile (MRBM) developed by Iran and unveiled in February 2019 in an underground missile factory. The Iranian armed forces said that this missile has a range of 1000 kilometers (620 miles).
Brigadier General Amir Ali Hajizadeh said this is an upgrade on the older Zolfaghar model, that had a range of 700 kilometers.

See also 
 Fateh-110
 Zolfaghar (missile)
 Haj Qasem (missile)
 List of military equipment manufactured in Iran
 Science and technology in Iran
 Raad-500 (missile)
 Khorramshahr (missile)

References

Ballistic missiles of Iran
Medium-range ballistic missiles of Iran
Surface-to-surface missiles of Iran
Guided missiles of Iran
Theatre ballistic missiles